Kandas may refer to:
Kandas language, Papua New Guinea
Synonym of "oralman", Kazakh repatriants
 Plural of Kanda (lineage), Kongo
 Plural for "kanda", or "chapter" in Sanskrit sources
"Kandas", a track from album Satu Untuk Berbagi